The Monte Rosa Tour is a circular hiking trail through the Swiss & Italian Alps around Monte Rosa (4634m). The tour also encircles the Dom (4,545 m) in the Mischabel range.

Typical overnight stops are
 Zermatt
 Theodulpass (highest point: 3,301 m)
 St-Jacques in the Ayas valley
 Gressoney-La-Trinité
 Alagna Valsesia
 Macugnaga-Staffa
 Saas-Fee
 Grächen
 Europahütte

The section from Saas-Fee to Grächen is sometimes known as the Balfrin Höhenweg, or "high path".

Grächen to Zermatt is along the Europaweg, and passes the Europa Hut.

External links
 www.tmr-matterhorn.com
 www.europaweg.ch

Hiking trails in Switzerland
Hiking trails in Italy
Monte Rosa